The Visitation is a 1999 contemporary Christian novel by Frank Peretti.  Taking place in the fictional wheat town of Antioch, located in eastern Washington, The Visitation is told in first-person narrative by the protagonist, a former minister named Travis Jordan who struggles to reconcile his former pastoral life with that of a present-day false Messiah.

Plot summary
Centered on the life of Travis Jordan, The Visitation begins when miracles, ranging from a healing, weeping crucifix to sights of Jesus in the clouds, start occurring, giving way to the arrival of a man who calls himself Brandon Nichols.  Nichols begins healing people; giving a man who lost the use of his legs in the Vietnam War the ability to walk, and performing various other "healings".  Most of the townspeople — who are portrayed as disillusioned, post-Pentecostal farmers — begin to believe in Nichols as a Messiah.

Brandon Nichols begins to hold "revival meetings" on a large ranch outside of town every Sunday, and many churchgoers in town stop going to Sunday morning mass/services and instead listen to Brandon talk and watch him "heal".  It is at this point that Nichols arouses the ire of one of the local ministers, Kyle Sherman.  Enlisting the help of Travis Jordan, he seeks to prove that the so-called Brandon Nichols is not in fact a "better" Christian Messiah, but a puffed-up egomaniac using occult powers.

In the end, the team (along with the help of a few others) uncover a host of pseudonyms and a hefty helping of deception surrounding Nichols' past. Startling parallels are revealed with the life story of Travis Jordan, all of which come to light as the story progresses.

Parody
Numerous "in jokes" are to be found within the book, most of them referencing some Pentecostal belief or practice.  For example, the entire life story of Travis Jordan is one of disillusionment with idyllic Charismaticism.  The entire book is rife with slightly humorous stories of "leg-lengthening services" and long nights of wailing in tongues.

There is also a reference to a fictional "Bishop of the Island."  This parodies some charismatic youth groups which reportedly spend all their time "praying in the Spirit" and "casting out demons" while never examining Bible scriptures or applying their precepts to their lives.

While some people might find such parody inappropriate/sacrilegious, many individuals who have grown up within the charismatic sub-culture find it quite humorous.  As such, The Visitation has been considered somewhat lighter in nature than Peretti's other fiction.

Film Adaptation
A film based on The Visitation has been released by Twentieth Century Fox and stars Martin Donovan and Edward Furlong.

External links
 Entry in FrankPeretti.com

1999 American novels
American horror novels
American novels adapted into films
Novels set in Washington (state)
Novels by Frank E. Peretti